Peter William Huber (November 3, 1952 – January 8, 2021) was a lawyer and author who served as a senior fellow at the Manhattan Institute and was a founding partner at the law firm of Kellogg, Huber, Hansen, Todd, Evans & Figel. He is credited with popularizing the term "junk science" in 1991, and articulating a conservative approach to environmentalism in his 2000 book, Hard Green: Saving the Environment from the Environmentalists.

Life and career
Huber was born on November 3, 1952, in Toronto, Canada, and grew up in Geneva, Switzerland. He entered the Massachusetts Institute of Technology at age 17. He received a Ph.D. in mechanical engineering in 1976 at the age of 23 and joined the MIT faculty as a professor, receiving tenure two years later.

While a professor at MIT, Huber began attending Harvard Law School. He was an editor of the Harvard Law Review and graduated in 1982 with a Juris Doctor summa cum laude. Huber was the only Harvard Law graduate between 1975 and 1996 who received the summa cum laude distinction. 

Huber then clerked first for judge (later Supreme Court justice) Ruth Bader Ginsburg of the U.S. Court of Appeals for the D.C. Circuit from 1982 to 1983, and then for justice Sandra Day O'Connor of the U.S. Supreme Court from 1983 to 1984.

Books
 
 
 
 
 
  (with Kenneth R. Foster)
 
 
 
  (with Mark P. Mills)

See also 
List of law clerks of the Supreme Court of the United States (Seat 8)

Notes

External links
 
 Peter Huber at MIT Press.
 Peter Huber at Manhattan Institute's City Journal quarterly magazine.

American non-fiction writers
Harvard Law School alumni
Law clerks of the Supreme Court of the United States
MIT School of Engineering alumni
1952 births
2021 deaths
Manhattan Institute for Policy Research